Jenni Vähämaa (born 26 May 1992) is a Finnish former figure skater. She is the 2007 Finlandia Trophy champion and placed in the top ten at four ISU Championships, including the 2008 European Championships.

Career
Vähämaa started skating at age four. She made her senior international debut at the 2007 Finlandia Trophy, which she won. She missed the 2008 Finnish Championships due to a time conflict with the Junior Grand Prix Final. She qualified for the 2008 Europeans from her scores at other competitions. It was her first senior ISU Championships. She placed 10th.

Vähämaa turned fully senior for the 2008–2009 season. She placed 8th at the 2008 Skate Canada International. She had been assigned to the 2008 Cup of Russia but withdrew before the event due to injury. She missed the rest of the season because of injury.

Programs

Competitive highlights
GP: Grand Prix; JGP: Junior Grand Prix

Detailed results

2008–2009 season

 SP = Short Program; FS = Free Skating

2007–2008 season

2006–2007 season

2005–2006 season

 SP = Short Program; FS = Free Skating

References

External links

 
 Official website 

Living people
1992 births
People from Lohja
Finnish female single skaters
Sportspeople from Uusimaa
21st-century Finnish women